Ellenboro may refer to:
United States
 Ellenboro, North Carolina
 Ellenboro, West Virginia
 Ellenboro, Wisconsin, a town
 Ellenboro (community), Wisconsin, an unincorporated community